Death by Rock and Roll is the fourth studio album by American rock band the Pretty Reckless, released on February 12, 2021. It is the band's first album released with their new label, Fearless Records, and is also the band's first album since the death of their long-time producer, Kato Khandwala in 2018. The album was produced by Jonathan Wyman, vocalist Taylor Momsen, and guitarist Ben Phillips, along with additional production done by Nate Yacchichino. The album was preceded by two singles: "Death by Rock and Roll" and "And So It Went" featuring Tom Morello. There were also two promotional singles released prior to the album: "Broomsticks" and "25".

Background and recording
In April 2018, the band's longtime-producer, Kato Khandwala, was involved in a motorcycle accident and died later due to injuries from the crash. Speaking about Khandwala's death, Taylor Momsen stated:

The band was also struggling with the death of Soundgarden vocalist Chris Cornell in 2017.

In November 2019, it was announced that the band had begun working on their fourth studio album. The album's title, a phrase often used by Khandwala, was later revealed in February 2020. "It was like a code that we lived our life by, and that I still live my life by," Momsen said of the title. "It's very much a battle cry for life: live life your own way." The album was recorded at London Bridge Studios in Seattle, Washington.

Release
The album was released on February 12, 2021. The lead single, "Death by Rock and Roll" was released on May 15, 2020. A promotional single, "Broomsticks", was released on October 22, 2020. The second promotional single, "25", was released on November 13, 2020. The second single, "And So It Went" (featuring Tom Morello), was released on January 8, 2021.

Speaking about releasing music during the COVID-19 pandemic in an interview with Kerrang!, lead vocalist Taylor Momsen stated:

Composition
Death by Rock and Roll has mainly been described as hard rock, alternative rock, and grunge. In describing the album, Good Call Live stated, "from heavy grunge-laden riffs to classic rock hooks, from theatrical rock to an almost country rock element this album has the band wearing their hearts on their sleeves." The title track has been described as an "outlaw-styled rock track with an ascending, evocative chorus and vibrant guitar melody." Kato Khandwala's footsteps can be heard in the song's intro. The song "Only Love Can Save Me Now," an homage to Chris Cornell, contains "bluesey grunge riffs", and has been compared to 90s grunge bands like Soundgarden and Alice In Chains. "And So It Went" has also been described as a grunge song and even features a guitar solo from Tom Morello. "25" has been described a leaning towards progressive rock. The song "My Bones" is a "no-frills rock" song and has been compared to Thin Lizzy and Kiss "Got So High" is a "semi-acoustic" song. "Broomsticks" is a short, Halloween-themed track and has been compared to Tim Burton movies. "Witches Burn" has been compared to Danzig. "Standing at the Wall" is a reflective and "semi-acoustic" song, similarly to "Got So High". "Turning Gold" has a "'80s rock feel". "Rock and Roll Heaven" is a country rock and "Americana-style ballad". The closing track, "Harley Darling" is a country rock, folk rock, and rootsy ballad, and is an homage to Khandwala.

Critical reception

Death by Rock and Roll received generally positive reviews from critics. Dom Lawson of Blabbermouth.net was positive towards the album stating, "fortunately, there are several genuinely great songs on here, all with huge amounts of disarming charm." Henry Yates of Classic Rock complimented the album as "their first attempt to claw back what they had", calling it "brilliant".

Vicky Greer of Gigwise called the album a "prime example of the healing power of rock and roll". James Hickie of Kerrang! was positive towards the album and considered the album to be "made by people who have suffered for their art and whose art will in turn soothe their suffering." Paris Fawcett of Metal Hammer was less positive stating, "TPR trade the rambunctious anthems of previous records for a vulnerable and reflective approach, yet often come across as more schmaltzy than tortured."

Sophie Williams of NME complimented Momsen's vocals saying that "her delivery is invariably the best thing about 'Death By Rock And Roll'." Bennie Osborne of Noizze called the album a "defining moment in their musical exploration". Mike DeWald of Riff Magazine stated, "Death By Rock and Roll thrives on its ability to surprise and delight while staying faithful to its core."

The album was elected by Loudwire as the 6th best rock/metal album of 2021.

Commercial performance
In the United States, Death by Rock and Roll was the highest selling album in the country in its release week, selling 16,000 copies and earning 17,366 album equivalent units in total. The album debuted at the top of the Top Album Sales chart, becoming the band's first number one and third top ten, while reaching the 28th position on the Billboard 200. Of the total number of albums sold, 5,300 were sold in vinyl format, enabling a number five debut on the Vinyl Albums Chart.

Track listing
All tracks written by Taylor Momsen and Ben Phillips. All tracks produced by Momsen, Phillips and Jonathan Wyman.

Personnel
The Pretty Reckless
 Taylor Momsen – lead vocals, rhythm guitar
 Ben Phillips – lead guitar, keyboards, piano, backing vocals
 Mark Damon – bass
 Jamie Perkins – drums, percussion

Additional musicians
 Kim Thayil – additional guitars 
 Matt Cameron – additional drums, additional vocals 
 Tom Morello – additional guitars 
 Sara Hallie Richardson – backing vocals
 Anna Lombard – backing vocals
 Isaac Phillips – harmonica
 David Pontbriand – sitar, tanpura 
 Duncan Watt – keyboards, orchestra, organ, piano

Production
 Taylor Momsen – production
 Ben Phillips – production 
 Jonathan Wyman – production, drum programming, engineering, mixing, additional guitars, keyboards
 Nate Yacchichino – additional production
 Ted Jensen – mastering
 Jay Colangelo – drum technician
 Neil Hundt – drum technician
 Danny Hastings –  photography
 Sean Kelly – assistant engineer, production technician
 Adam Larson – package design

Charts

References

2021 albums
Fearless Records albums
The Pretty Reckless albums